U.S. Route 7 (US 7) is a north–south highway extending from southern Connecticut to the northernmost part of Vermont. In Vermont, the route extends for  along the western side of the state as a mostly two-lane rural road, with the exception of an expressway section between Bennington and East Dorset. US 7 is known as the Ethan Allen Highway for its entire length through the state, named after the US Revolutionary War general. US 7 ends at an interchange with Interstate 89 (I-89) in the town of Highgate, just south of the Canadian border. I-89 continues to the border crossing.

Route description

US 7 crosses the Massachusetts–Vermont state line at Pownal, from where the road heads north to Bennington as a rural two-lane highway. Just north of downtown Bennington, the highway transitions into a limited-access highway. For , US 7 is a true expressway with divided carriageways and multiple lanes. The road subsequently narrows down to an undivided two-lane freeway; however, many stretches have passing lanes. This continues to a point just south of East Dorset, where US 7 reverts to a surface road.

Most of US 7 between East Dorset and the Canadian border is an undivided, uncontrolled road varying in width from two to four lanes. Two divided highway sections also exist: a  section south of Rutland and a  stretch with numerous traffic signals between Shelburne and South Burlington known as Shelburne Road. There is overhead signage at the junction with I-189 in South Burlington that directs northbound trucks onto I-189. While US 7 heads directly into Burlington, I-189 bypasses the city to the south and east and leads directly to I-89, which runs close to US 7 north of Winooski.

From here, US 7 and I-89 run through northern Vermont to Highgate, where US 7 ends at the northernmost exit on I-89.

History
US 7 was assigned in 1926. I-89 was originally envisioned to parallel US 7 from the Massachusetts border to the Canadian frontier. This plan was ultimately canceled, and I-89 was shifted to its current alignment, turning southeast at Burlington toward Montpelier and White River Junction.

Major intersections

Suffixed routes
US 7 has two suffixed routes, both of which are old alignments of US 7.
VT 7A is an alternate route of US 7 between Bennington and Dorset. The route is signed as "Historic VT 7A" to distinguish it, the original routing of US 7, from the modern US 7 limited-access highway.
VT 7B is an alternate route of US 7 through the towns of Wallingford and Clarendon. VT 7B was the original alignment of US 7 prior to the construction of the current US 7 divided highway through the area.

US 7 Alternate

U.S. Route 7 Alternate (US 7 Alt.) is an alternate route of US 7 in Burlington. Mainline US 7 travels over Hyde Street and North and South Willard streets until the aforementioned intersection.

As of July 2016, there are three US 7 Alt. assemblies along the route. The original one is located on Saint Paul Street in Burlington, just south of the intersection with South Winooski Avenue and Howard Street, with the newer two on South Winooski Avenue, with one at the intersection with Pearl Street, and the other at Main Street.

, in conjunction with the reconstruction of the rotary-style intersection where US 7 Alt. terminates, there is a new directional US 7 Alt. sign installed in the rotary, along with a lone reassurance US 7 Alt. marker installed just to the north.

References

External links

07-0
Rutland, Vermont
Burlington, Vermont
Transportation in Addison County, Vermont
Transportation in Bennington County, Vermont
Transportation in Rutland County, Vermont
Transportation in Chittenden County, Vermont
Transportation in Franklin County, Vermont
Two-lane freeways in the United States
 Vermont